Alan Nahuel Ruiz (born 19 August 1993) is an Argentine professional footballer who plays as an attacking midfielder for F.C. Arouca in Primeira Liga.

International career
He was called in 2011 for the Argentina U-20 National Team, as part of the squad that played on the 2011 FIFA U-20 World Cup.

Career statistics

Honours
San Lorenzo
 Argentine Primera División: 2013 Torneo Inicial

Personal
He is the younger brother of Federico Ruiz.

References

External links
Alan Ruiz profile. Portal Oficial do Grêmio.

1993 births
Living people
Argentine footballers
Argentina under-20 international footballers
Argentine expatriate footballers
Footballers at the 2011 Pan American Games
Pan American Games medalists in football
Pan American Games silver medalists for Argentina
Association football midfielders
Medalists at the 2011 Pan American Games
Club de Gimnasia y Esgrima La Plata footballers
San Lorenzo de Almagro footballers
Grêmio Foot-Ball Porto Alegrense players
Club Atlético Colón footballers
Sporting CP footballers
Aldosivi footballers
Arsenal de Sarandí footballers
F.C. Arouca players
Argentine Primera División players
Primera Nacional players
Campeonato Brasileiro Série A players
Primeira Liga players
Argentine expatriate sportspeople in Brazil
Argentine expatriate sportspeople in Portugal
Expatriate footballers in Brazil
Expatriate footballers in Portugal
Footballers from La Plata